Anna Polívková (born 24 March 1979 in Prague) is a Czech actress. In December 2013 Polívková won the sixth season of StarDance with her professional partner Michal Kurtiš.

Selected filmography

Films 
 Po čem muži touží (2018)
 Pohádky pro Emu (2016)
 Účastníci zájezdu (2006)
 The Idiot Returns (1999)

TV series 
 Živě z mechu (2016)
 Až po uši (2014)
 Ordinace v růžové zahradě (2005)

References

External links
 
 Biography on csfd.cz

1979 births
Living people
Actresses from Prague
Czech film actresses
20th-century Czech actresses
21st-century Czech actresses
Czech stage actresses
Czech television actresses
Academy of Performing Arts in Prague alumni